The Athens Internet Exchange (https://web.archive.org/web/20080315061014/http://www.aix.gr/) was until January 2010 the main Internet Exchange Point in Greece, offering peering connectivity between the largest commercial ISPs as well as the academic network organization, GRNET. Operational authorities were GRNET along with the Network Operations Centre of the National Technical University of Athens. It operated under the auspices of the Hellenic National Telecommunications and Posts Committee the Greek regulator.

AIX members were the following ISPs:

 GRNET   
 Forthnet 
 Hellas OnLine
 Altec Telecoms
 Net One 
 Vivodi 
 Verizon Hellas 
 On Telecoms 
 Otenet
 ORANGE BUSINESS SERVICES  
 AT&T Global Network Services Hellas  
 Vodafone NET  
 Wind 
 Tellas
 Lannet

AIX was a founding member of European Internet Exchange Association (Euro-IX)

In January 2010, AIX was replaced by the Greek Internet Exchange.

External links
[netmon diagrams] : 
IXP  [industry definition of an IXP] : 
 Internet exchange points
 European Internet Exchange Association
Packet Clearing House: Directory of Internet Exchange Points

Internet in Greece
Internet exchange points in Greece
Routing